Andromachus is the name of a number of people from classical antiquity:

Andromachus of Cyprus, 4th century BCE commander of the Cyprian fleet at the Siege of Tyre by Alexander the Great
Andromachus (ruler of Tauromenium), 4th century BCE ruler of ancient Tauromenium, Sicily
Andromachus (cavalry general), commander of the Eleans in 364 BCE who committed suicide after his army was defeated by the Arcadians
Andromachus (son of Achaeus), 3rd century BCE Anatolian nobleman, son of Achaeus, and grandson of Seleucus I Nicator
Andromachus of Aspendus, one of the commanders of the forces of Ptolemy IV Philopator at the Battle of Raphia in 217 BCE

Andromachus (physician), two Greek physicians, father and son, who lived in the time of Roman emperor Nero in the 1st century CE
Andromachus (grammarian), quoted in the Scholia on Homer and possibly the author of the 12th-century Etymologicum Magnum

Andromachus Philologus, the 3rd-century CE husband of Moero and father of Homerus